The 2007–08 Arizona Wildcats men's basketball team represented the University of Arizona during the 2007–08 NCAA Division I men's basketball season. The Wildcats, led by first year head coach Kevin O'Neill, played their home games at the McKale Center and are members of the Pacific-10 Conference.

Recruiting class
Source:

Roster

Depth chart

Schedule

|-
!colspan=9 style="background:#; color:white;"| Regular season

|-
!colspan=9 style="background:#;"| Pac-10 tournament

|-
!colspan=9 style="background:#;"| NCAA tournament

Awards
Jerryd Bayless
Pac-10 All-Freshman First Team
Pac-10 All-Conference Second Team
Pac-10 Player of the Week – February 18, 2008
Chase Budinger
Pac-10 All-Conference Third Team
Pac-10 Player of the Week – February 2, 2009
Jordan Hill
Pac-10 Player of the Week – December 10, 2007

References

Arizona Wildcats men's basketball seasons
Arizona Wildcats
Arizona
Arizona Wildcats
Arizona Wildcats